Mikalojus is a Lithuanian masculine given name derived from Greek Νικόλαος (Nikolaos). It is a cognate of English-language name Nicholas. People bearing the name include:

Mikalojus Akelaitis (1828–1887), Lithuanian writer, publicist and linguist 
Mikalojus Konstantinas Čiurlionis (1875–1911), Lithuanian painter, composer and writer
Mikalojus Daukša (c. 1527–1613), Lithuanian religious writer, translator and Catholic church official 
Mikalojus I Radvila (c. 1450–1509), Lithuanian nobleman
Mikalojus II Radvila (1470–1521), Lithuanian nobleman
Mikalojus Radvila Juodasis (1515–1565), Lithuanian nobleman

Lithuanian masculine given names